Thawai is a Tangkhul village to the south of Ukhrul headquarters in Ukhrul district of Manipur state, India. The village is about 28 km from Imphal and about 54 km from Ukhrul town. It falls under Litan Police station of Phungyar-Sub division. As of 2014, the village had 335 households and a population of 2000 out of which 1050 are males and 950 were females. The National Highway 150 passes through Thawai

Village boundary
Thawai is flanked by the following neighboring villages demarcating the village boundary.

North: Sarkaphung Village

South: Riha Village

East: Marou Village

West: Hongmahn Village

Mountains and rivers
Mountains:

1. Rammaying Kaphung(Mapithel)

2. Hongshungkat Kaphung(Mahadev/Valley View)

Rivers:

1. Yangwui Kong(River)

2. Marau Kong

External links
 History of this place on YouTube

Villages in Ukhrul district